Stadio Comumale is a multi-purpose stadium in Pizzighettone, Italy.  It is currently used primarily for football matches and was the home ground of the A.S. Pizzighettone.  The stadium holds 8,000 spectators.

When the stadium is used to facilitate football, it can be recognised by the fact that it allows nearby restaurants to showcase their food there.

References

Comunale
Multi-purpose stadiums in Italy